The Rap Game is an American reality television series. The series premiered on January 1, 2016, on Lifetime. The winners of seasons 1-5 respectively, were Miss Mulatto, Mani, Nova, Street Bud and Tyeler Reign.

Other notable contestants that appeared on the show and competed on another include J.I the Prince of N.Y (season 2), and King Roscoe and Flau'Jae (both in season 3). The latter two competed on America's Got Talent (King Roscoe in Season 9 in 2014 and Flau'Jae in season 13 in 2018). Season 4's Lil Bri appeared on season 2 of The Four: Battle for Stardom in 2018.

Series overview

Episodes

Season 1 (2016)

Season 2 (2016)
This season's contestants were Nia Kay, Jayla Marie, Lil' Key, J.I and Mani, Mini Barbie (eliminated in ep 1), Tally (eliminated ep 1)

Season 3 (2017)
This season the contestants were Nova, King Roscoe, Flau'jae, Deetranada and Tally (Who left the competition in the 12th episode (says her dad ordered her home immediately)

Season 4 (2017–18)
This season the contestants were Street Bud, Lil Bri, Jordan Air Young, Rap-Unzel and Ricci Bitti

Season 5 (2019) 
Season 5 of The Rap Game premiered on January 11, 2019. Contestants in this season were Tyeler Reign, Eli Triplett, Queen Amayah, Nya Kasan, Sire, and Lil Richye (eliminated after ep 1).

Winners

International version
A British version called The Rap Game UK hosted by DJ Target, Krept & Konan has aired annually on BBC Three since 23 August 2019.

References

External links
 Official Website
 

2010s American reality television series
2016 American television series debuts
2019 American television series endings
Lifetime (TV network) original programming